Kevin Jones (born May 12, 1967) is a freestyle BMX rider. Raised in York, Pennsylvania, at age 11 he started riding BMX and began BMX racing in 1982. Though successful, he abruptly quit, as he enjoyed dirt jumping more than racing.

In 1983, Jones' interest in breakdancing peaked. He formed a troupe with fellow BMXers Mark Eaton, Mike Daily, Jamie McKulik and Dale Mitzel, calling themselves the Cardboard Lords. By April 1985, they had won numerous local competitions, including a York cable show called The Great York Talent Hunt. However, breakdancing's popularity was waning, and Jones drifted back to BMX. Around that time, Daily introduced Jones to his freestyle team, the Plywood Hoods. Daily also showed Jones the modern freestyle BMX bike. Jones bought a similar bike for himself, realizing that the additions of components such as pegs for standing and cable detangling rotors permitted a variety of more daring tricks.

Flatland career
In November 1986, Jones entered the AFA Veladrome Finals as an expert.  He turned heads with some new innovative tricks like the "Hang glider Boomerang", the "Chicken Hook Switch", and the "Insanity Roll".  in the following months, Kevin focused his riding toward inventing new tricks to measure up to what he assumed to be the "norm", and continued to practice hard for their next competition in Austin, TX.
In Austin, Texas, 1987, Jones entered his 3rd AFA Masters contest, debuting four of his own tricks, the Locomotive, the Trolley, the Standup Infinity Roll, and the Elephant Glide. Months later at the velodrome in Carson, California, Jones had an amazing, flawless run, debuting another new trick called the Dump Truck where he turned the bike upside down while riding a wheelie from the rear pegs.

Around this time, fellow Plywood Hood member & film maker Mark Eaton would release the first of a series of freestyle BMX videos named Dorkin' In York. The Dorkin''' videos, as they would become known as, captured equal parts of flatland, ramps, and street riding. The series would continue on for years to come, showcasing the latest tricks from Jones and the rest of the Plywood Hoods, as well as coverage from major contests and some more private jams and practice sessions. Eaton recently released the entire series in a DVD boxset titled Dorkin' in York – The Complete DVD Collection.

in December 1988, Kevin invented & pulled off the first ever "Hitch Hiker", a trick where the rider stands on the 2 front pegs, with the bike upside down in front, rolling on the front wheel, and the rider holding the back tire in his hand.  This was one of the first 2 footed rolling tricks to be introduced to BMX Flatland, and the beginning of what is now considered to be modern-day flatland.

In 1990, the Kudos granola bar company hired Jones to endorse its product on national television. That same year, Jones toured with the Wilkerson Airlines bike company. However, after these thrusts into the national spotlight, Jones became more reclusive. Aside from the installments of the Dorkin' series, Jones had virtually disappeared from the BMX scene.

In 1991, Kevin was riding with Chase Gouin on an average of 10hrs/day, and they were setting out to master every trick both "switch"  & "regular", on a quest to be able to link any trick into any other trick.

, Jones still rides, but has never re-entered the contest scene, nor has he toured for a major bike manufacturer.

In August 2006, it was announced that Jones was making a new version of the legendary Big Daddy frame for Hoffman Bikes, and that he'd be rejoining the company's pro team. The new version of the frame was called the Strowler''.

References 

1967 births
Living people
American male cyclists
BMX riders
Sportspeople from York, Pennsylvania